State Road 38 is an IB-class road in western and southern Serbia, connecting Makrešane with Beloljin. It is located in Šumadija and Western Serbia and Southern and Eastern Serbia regions.
Before the new road categorization regulation given in 2013, the route wore the following names: O 18, P 102, P 221б, P 102 and P 222 (before 2012) / 163 and 18 (after 2012).

The existing route is a main road with two traffic lanes. By the valid Space Plan of Republic of Serbia the road is not planned for upgrading to motorway, and is expected to be conditioned in its current state.

Sections

See also 
 Roads in Serbia

References

External links 
 Official website - Roads of Serbia (Putevi Srbije)
 Official website - Corridors of Serbia (Koridori Srbije) (Serbian)

State roads in Serbia